Marcel Louis Ospel (8 February 1950 – 26 April 2020) was a Swiss banker and the longtime head of the multinational investment bank UBS.

Career 
Ospel started his banking career as an apprentice at a small Swiss bank in 1965 with a monthly salary of CHF 110. He pursued further education in Switzerland and abroad, and joined the marketing and planning division of the Swiss Bank Corporation (SBC) in 1977. He rose to become the bank's head and the architect of its 1998 merger with the Union Bank of Switzerland to what is now UBS. The new bank, of which he became CEO, was then the second-largest bank in the world.

Ospel stepped down as CEO in 2001 to become chairman of the board of directors, but retained tight operational control over UBS. In this role, he refused to continue financing the ailing national airline Swissair and was considered by many to share responsibility for its collapse in 2001. His annual salary of up to CHF 26 million – exceptional in Switzerland but less so in international banking – was another topic of frequent controversy during his tenure as chairman.

In the 2000s, Ospel pursued an aggressive growth strategy in investment banking and structured finance, acquiring Paine Webber among others, and was considered to be one of the most powerful men in Switzerland. But his strategy resulted in CHF 80 billion of losses to UBS with the collapse of UBS's Dillon Read investment bank during the global financial crisis. Ospel was forced to resign in April 2008, following pressure by the Swiss Financial Market Supervisory Authority, and UBS had to seek a government bailout in October 2008. In retirement, Ospel remained active as a private investor, but remained a target of public criticism and occasional protests on account of his former salary and his leadership of UBS.

Personal life 
Ospel was born to a middle-class family in Basel. He later lived in Wollerau, Canton of Schwyz.

Ospel died on 26 April 2020 of cancer at his home in Wollerau. He is survived by his third wife Adriana Bodmer and his six children.

References 

1950 births
2020 deaths
20th-century Swiss businesspeople
UBS people
21st-century Swiss businesspeople
Swiss bankers
Swiss chief executives
Swiss investors
Businesspeople from Basel-Stadt
Deaths from cancer in Switzerland